Idactus coquereli is a species of beetle in the family Cerambycidae. It was described by Fairmaire in 1890.

References

Ancylonotini
Beetles described in 1890